Hauke Wahl (born 15 April 1994) is a German professional footballer who plays as a centre-back for  club Holstein Kiel.

Career
Wahl joined Holstein Kiel from Dynamo Dresden in 2012. After playing for the club's U19 team he made the first team in 2013.

In August 2016, Wahl left Holstein Kiel for SC Paderborn, freshly relegated from the Bundesliga. He signed a three-year contract.

In June 2016, he signed a three-year deal with Ingolstadt, joining on a free transfer from Paderborn. In December 2016, it was announced he would move to 1. FC Heidenheim on loan until the end of the 2016–17 season.

In July 2018, Wahl returned to his former club Holstein Kiel having agreed a three-year contract until 2021. A year later, he agreed a contract extension until 2023 with the club.

References

External links
 
 
 

1994 births
Living people
German footballers
Footballers from Hamburg
Association football central defenders
SC Paderborn 07 players
Holstein Kiel players
FC Ingolstadt 04 players
FC Ingolstadt 04 II players
1. FC Heidenheim players
2. Bundesliga players
3. Liga players
Regionalliga players
Holstein Kiel II players